Ius singulare is Latin for "singular law". It was special law for certain groups of people, things, or legal relations (because of which it is an exception from the general principles of the legal system). An example of this is the law about wills written by people in the military during a campaign, which are exempt of the solemnities generally required for citizens when writing wills in normal circumstances.

It contrasts with the ius commune, the general, ordinary law. As Roman law evolved into modern legal systems, the concept of ius singulare was abandoned and ius commune was applied to all cases.

See also
Roman law
Palm Sunday Compromise

Roman law
Latin legal terminology